

V 

 13474 Vʹyus
 
 
 
 
 
 
 
 
 
 
 
 
 
 
 
 7529 Vagnozzi
 
 
 
 
 1573 Väisälä
 
 
 
 131 Vala
 
 
 839 Valborg
 
 
 262 Valda
 
 2741 Valdivia
 
 
 
 
 447 Valentine
 611 Valeria
 
 
 
 
 
 
 
 610 Valeska
 
 
 
 
 
 
 
 
 
 
 
 
 
 
 
 
 
 
 3962 Valyaev
 
 
 
 
 2019 van Albada
 
 
 
 1781 Van Biesbroeck
 
 
 
 1965 van de Kamp
 
 4230 van den Bergh
 
 1663 van den Bos
 
 
 
 
 
 
 
 
 
 
 
 
 
 
 
 
 
 52266 Van Flandern
 
 
 
 
 
 
 
 
 
 
 
 
 
 
 
 
 
 
 
 
 
 
 
 
 
 
 
 
 
 
 
 
 
 240 Vanadis
 
 
 
 
 
 
 
 
 
 
 
 
 
 
 
 
 3401 Vanphilos
 
 
 
 
 
 
 
 174567 Varda
 
 
 
 
 
 
 
 
 
 
 
 
 1263 Varsavia
 
 
 20000 Varuna
 
 
 
 
 
 
 
 17163 Vasifedoseev
 
 
 
 
 2014 Vasilevskis
 
 
 
 
 
 
 
 1312 Vassar
 
 
 
 
 
 
 416 Vaticana
 
 
 
 
 
 
 
 
 2862 Vavilov
 
 
 
 
 
 
 
 4962 Vecherka
 
 
 
 
 
 
 
 
 
 
 
 
 
 
 
 
 
 
 17035 Velichko
 
 
 
 
 
 126 Velleda
 
 
 
 
 
 
 
 487 Venetia
 
 
 
 
 
 
 
 
 
 
 
 
 
 499 Venusia
 
 
 245 Vera
 
 
 
 
 
 
 
 
 
 
 
 
 
 
 
 3551 Verenia
 
 
 
 
 
 490 Veritas
 
 
 
 
 
 
 
 
 
 
 
 
 
 
 
 
 
 
 
 612 Veronika
 
 
 
 
 3669 Vertinskij
 
 
 
 
 
 
 
 
 
 
 
 
 4 Vesta
 
 
 2011 Veteraniya
 
 
 
 
 
 
 
 144 Vibilia
 
 
 1097 Vicia
 
 
 
 
 2644 Victor Jara
 
 
 
 
 
 12 Victoria
 
 
 
 
 
 
 
 
 
 
 
 
 
 
 
 
 
 397 Vienna
 
 
 
 
 1053 Vigdis
 
 
 
 1478 Vihuri
 
 
 
 
 
 
 
 
 
 
 32226 Vikulgupta
 
 
 
 
 
 
 
 
 
 
 
 
 
 
 
 
 
 1310 Villigera
 10140 Villon
 
 
 
 
 
 
 
 
 
 366 Vincentina
 
 
 231 Vindobona
 
 759 Vinifera
 
 
 
 
 1544 Vinterhansenia
 1076 Viola
 
 
 
 
 
 557 Violetta
 
 
 
 
 
 
 
 
 
 
 50 Virginia
 
 
 
 
 
 1449 Virtanen
 
 1887 Virton
 494 Virtus
 6102 Visby
 
 
 
 
 
 
 4034 Vishnu
 
 
 
 
 
 
 
 
 
 
 
 
 
 
 1030 Vitja
 
 
 
 
 
 
 
 
 
 
 
 
 
 1623 Vivian
 
 
 
 
 
 
 
 
 
 
 
 
 
 1724 Vladimir
 
 
 
 
 
 
 
 
 
 
 
 
 
 
 2123 Vltava
 
 
 
 
 
 
 
 
 
 9910 Vogelweide
 1439 Vogtia
 
 
 
 
 
 
 
 
 
 1149 Volga
 
 6189 Völk
 
 3703 Volkonskaya
 1790 Volkov
 
 
 
 1380 Volodia
 
 
 
 
 2009 Voloshina
 
 
 
 
 
 
 
 
 
 
 
 
 
 
 
 
 
 
 
 
 
 
 
 
 
 
 
 
 
 
 
 
 
 
 
 
 
 
 
 
 
 
 
 
 
 
 
 
 
 
 
 
 
 
 
 
 
 
 
 
 
 
 
 
 
 
 
 
 
 
 
 
 635 Vundtia
 
 
 
 
 1600 Vyssotsky

See also 
 List of minor planet discoverers
 List of observatory codes

References 
 

Lists of minor planets by name